J. Brent Siegrist (born September 30, 1952) is an American politician from the state of Iowa. A member of the Republican Party, he served in the Iowa House of Representatives for twenty years, non-consecutively, ten of which he filled the role of Speaker.

Career
Prior to getting into politics, Siegrist worked as a high school teacher. He was first elected to the Iowa House of Representatives in the 1984 elections. He served as Speaker of the Iowa House.

Siegrist announced he would not seek reelection to the Iowa House in 2002, choosing instead to run for a seat in the United States House of Representatives. He lost in the Republican primary to Steve King.

Since leaving the Iowa House, Siegrist has worked for the Iowa Area Education Agencies. In 2013, he announced he would run for mayor of Council Bluffs, Iowa. He lost the election to Matt Walsh, a fellow Republican.

In 2020 Siegrist rejoined the Iowa House of Representatives, representing district 16.

Personal
Siegrist and his wife, Valerie, have two children.

References

External links

Living people
1952 births
Republican Party members of the Iowa House of Representatives
Speakers of the Iowa House of Representatives
Politicians from Council Bluffs, Iowa
Place of birth missing (living people)